Jeddito is a census-designated place (CDP) in Navajo County, Arizona, United States. The population was 293 at the 2010 census.

Geography

Jeddito is located at  (35.772023, -110.127016).

Jeddito lies within a  exclave of the Navajo Nation. This exclave is surrounded by territory of the Hopi Indian Reservation, which is itself surrounded by the Navajo Nation. There was a population of 1,065 living on the exclave in the 2000 census.

Demographics

As of the census of 2000, there were 390 people, 99 households, and 79 families living in the CDP. There were 126 housing units at an average density of 22.6/sq mi (8.7/km2). The racial makeup of the CDP was 6% White, 93% Native American, 0% Asian, 0% from other races, and 1% from two or more races.  1% of the population were Hispanic or Latino of any race.

There were 99 households, out of which 60%% had children under the age of 18 living with them, 46% were married couples living together, 30% had a female householder with no husband present, and 20% were non-families. 17% of all households were made up of individuals, and 1% had someone living alone who was 65 years of age or older.  The average household size was 3.9 and the average family size was 4.5.

In the CDP, the population was spread out, with 49% under the age of 18, 8% from 18 to 24, 27% from 25 to 44, 14% from 45 to 64, and 3% who were 65 years of age or older.  The median age was 19 years. For every 100 females, there were 77 males.  For every 100 females age 18 and over, there were 82 males.

The median income for a household in the CDP was $20,417, and the median income for a family was $12,778. Males had a median income of $35,375 versus $30,469 for females. The per capita income for the CDP was $5,347.  About 42% of families and 46% of the population were below the poverty line, including 56% of those under age 18 and 25% of those age 65 or over.

Education
Jeddito is a part of the Cedar Unified School District.

The Navajo name of Jádító (Antelope Water) was derived from nearby watering points, which were frequently used by antelopes.  Most families living within the Jeddito "island" are members of the extended families who were forcefully evicted from the old Hopi Reservation (District 6) in September and October 1944.  This marked the first mass relocation of Navajos determined to be living on the wrong side of the Navajo-Hopi boundary.  The portion referred to as Jeddito "island" is totally surrounded by the Hopi Partitioned Land.  Another segment of the chapter's land base is part of the main Navajo reservation on the Apache County side.  The "island" part is situated exclusively in Navajo County.

White Cone High School served Jeddito until the closure of the school in 2012.

References

Jeddito, Census Tract 9448, Navajo County, Arizona United States Census Bureau

Census-designated places in Navajo County, Arizona
Populated places on the Navajo Nation